William Zachary Braddock (born August 23, 1987) is a former professional baseball pitcher. He played in Major League Baseball (MLB) for the Milwaukee Brewers

Professional career

Milwaukee Brewers
Braddock was drafted by the Milwaukee Brewers in the 18th round of the 2005 Major League Baseball Draft out of Gloucester Catholic High School.

A native of Mount Holly Township, Braddock was called up to the majors for the first time on May 23, 2010, and recorded his first Major League win on June 7 of that season.

On May 4, 2012, he was released by the Brewers.

Baltimore Orioles
On December 19, 2012, Braddock was signed to a minor league deal with the Baltimore Orioles and received an invitation to spring training with the big club.
He was released by the Orioles on May 24, 2013.

San Diego Padres
Braddock signed a minor league deal with the San Diego Padres on January 6, 2014. He was released in March.

Camden Riversharks
Braddock signed with the Camden Riversharks for the 2015 season.

He became a free agent after the 2015 season.

References

External links

1987 births
Living people
Milwaukee Brewers players
Helena Brewers players
West Virginia Power players
Brevard County Manatees players
Huntsville Stars players
Nashville Sounds players
Peoria Javelinas players
Lancaster Barnstormers players
Bridgeport Bluefish players
Camden Riversharks players
Rowan Barons baseball players
Gloucester Catholic High School alumni
People from Mount Holly, New Jersey
Sportspeople from Burlington County, New Jersey
Baseball players from New Jersey
Major League Baseball pitchers